Isometamidium chloride is a triazene trypanocidal agent used in veterinary medicine.

It consists of a single Ethidium bromide like subunit linked to a fragment of the diminazene molecule.{[cn}}

Resistance
The Gibe River Valley in southwest Ethiopia showed universal resistance between July 1989 and February 1993. This likely indicates a permanent loss of function in this area against the tested target, T. congolense isolated from Boran cattle.

References 

Amidines
Antiparasitic agents
Quaternary ammonium compounds